Carex × uechtritziana is a species of sedge and is native to the Baltic States, France, Germany, Italy, and Northwest European Russia. Its parents are Carex acutiformis and Carex lasiocarpa.

References

uechtritziana
Flora of Estonia
Flora of Latvia
Flora of Lithuania
Flora of France
Flora of Germany
Flora of Italy
Flora of Russia
Plant nothospecies